This article lists the confirmed national futsal squads for the UEFA Futsal Euro 2016 tournament held in Serbia, between 2 February and 13 February 2016.

Group A

Head coach: Aca Kovačević

Head coach: Jorge Braz

Head coach: Andrej Dobovičnik

Group B

Head coach: José Venancio López

Head coach: Oleksandr Kosenko

Head coach: Sito Rivera

Group C

Head coach: Sergei Skorovich

Head coach: Mato Stanković

Head coach:  Kaká

Group D

Head coach: Roberto Menichelli

Head coach: Tomáš Neumann

Head coach: Tino Pérez

External links
UEFA.com

UEFA Futsal Championship squads
Squads